Zarina Mayramovna Gizikova  (born 20 June 1985 in Vladikavkaz, North Ossetia, Russian Federation) is a Russian retired individual rhythmic gymnast, an Honored Master of Sports of Russia and the 2002 Russian National All-around champion.

Career 
Gizikova originally trained in Kyiv, Ukraine under the Deriugins School of Rhythmic Gymnastics. Gizikova and her family reclocated, continuing her training at the Olympic Center for Rhythmic Gymnastics in Moscow, Russia. Irina Viner facilitated Gizikova to be under the guidance of Personal trainer Vera Shtelbaums, who then was also the coach of Irina Tchachina. Gizikova was a very dynamic gymnast having excellent technique work led to success early in her career.

Gizikova became member of Russian national team in 1997. She appeared in junior competition in World Club event in 1998 and 1999 at Aeon Cup in Tokyo. Gizikova began appearing in senior competitions in 2000. With the suspension of Kabaeva and Tchachina in a year for doping, Gizikova and teammate Laysan Utiasheva saw their emergence as Russia's new leading gymnasts. Gizikova became Russian National champion in 2002 and she was a member of the Russian Team that won gold at the 2002 European Championships. Unfortunately, due to her bad performance in her clubs routine, the russian coach Irina Viner gave her a hard and controversial sermon, which cast doubt her future in the team. She won silver in hoop at the 2002 World Cup Final in Stuttgart and won two gold medals (ball, hoop) at the 2002 Grand Prix Final in Innsbruck.

At the 2003 European Championships in Riesa, Gizikova won gold in ball and silver in hoop. She continued her success winning bronze in all-around and event finals at the 2003 Summer Universiade in Daegu. Gizikova later began again to struggle with consistency and with the reemergence of Kabaeva and Tchachina in Russia's National team saw Gizikova being overshadowed by her teammates and in her later career; in 2004 saw the rise of younger teammates Vera Sessina and Olga Kapranova, Gizikova finally completed her career in 2005.

In 2007, Gizikova and her sisters began coaching at the Palace of Sports in Storgino, Moscow and opened up their own gymnastics club.

Personal life 
Zarina has two older sisters (Inessa and Aziruchs Gizikova) who were also former rhythmic gymnasts. Her father was a former Soviet wrestler from North Ossetia and her mother, a former soviet skier of Korean descent.

References

External links
 
 Zarina Gizikova Profile 
 Rhythmic Gymnastics Results 
 

1985 births
Living people
Russian rhythmic gymnasts
Sportspeople from Vladikavkaz
Russian people of Korean descent
Ossetian people
Russian people of Ossetian descent
Universiade medalists in gymnastics
Universiade bronze medalists for Russia
Medalists at the 2003 Summer Universiade
Medalists at the Rhythmic Gymnastics European Championships